Hasina Cabinet is the name of either of four ministries of the Republic of Bangladesh:
First Hasina ministry (1996–2001)
Second Hasina ministry (2009–2014)
Third Hasina ministry (2014–2019)
Fourth Hasina ministry (since 2019)

See also 
Sheikh Hasina
Cabinet of Bangladesh